The 2012 Sultan of Johor Cup was the second edition of the Sultan of Johor Cup, an annual invitational international men's under-21 field hockey tournament in Malaysia. It was held in Johor Bahru, Johor, Malaysia from 11 to 18 November 2012.

Germany defeated India 3–2 through golden goal after being tied 2–2 in the final match to win the cup.

Participating nations
The number of teams for this year's cup was the same compared to the previous tournament where six teams competed.

Results
All times are in Malaysia Standard Time (UTC+08:00).

Preliminary round

Classification round

Fifth and sixth place

Third and fourth place

Final

Statistics

Final standings

Goalscorers

References

External links
Official website

Sultan of Johor Cup
Sultan of Johor Cup
Sultan of Johor Cup
Sultan of Johor Cup
Sultan of Johor Cup